"Bobo" is a song by Nigerian rapper and recording artist Olamide from his fifth studio album Eyan Mayweather. Produced by Young Jonn, the song was released on May 2, 2015 through YBNL Nation. "Bobo" was nominated in the "Song of The Year" category at The Headies 2015.

Reception
"Bobo" was met with positive reviews among music critics and massive airplay. With a view of promoting the song, a dance style called "Shakiti Bobo" was named after the song. Tola Bolaji of Nigerian Entertainment Today described the song as a combination of "rap and poetry" and further went on to state that: "This song obviously goes beyond the leg jumping to meet the hand rhythmic dance steps. It has a message. Next time take more time in listening to the message of Nigerian songs. You might just be lucky to meet one, just like a song writer in Naija said, one in a million". Henry Igwe of 360Nobs stated on the song: "The song is mellow, catchy, and carries tingly features that can freeze the industry heartbeat today, and get the people listening. The girls are spanking hot and popping".

Accolades

References

External links

2015 songs
Olamide songs
Yoruba-language songs
YBNL Nation singles